Lilium pomponium, the turban lily, is a European species of lily native to France, Spain, and Italy.

formerly included
Lilium pomponium var. carniolicum, now called Lilium carniolicum 
Lilium pomponium subsp. pyrenaicum, now called Lilium pyrenaicum

References

External links
Plants for a Future:Lilium pomponium

pomponium
Flora of Southwestern Europe
Plants described in 1753
Taxa named by Carl Linnaeus